Heatons is an Irish department store, established in 1946. The store specialises in fashion, homeware and sporting goods. They have 21 stores around Ireland, 20 in the Republic of Ireland and one in the Northern Ireland town of Enniskillen. The Northern Ireland town of Downpatrick was the former home to a combined Heatons and Sports Direct store, as was Newtownabbey (now solely a Sports Direct store). Heatons has a ecommerce website which delivers to both Ireland, and Northern Ireland.

Heatons briefly held a franchise for British Home Stores, and also co-located some shops with Iceland during their first venture into Ireland.

Heatons was acquired by Frasers Group (formerly Sports Direct International) in 2016, with Sports Direct having previously owned 50% of the chain from 2010, and having held a 42.5% stake since at least 2007.

Newer Heatons stores have been built with an attached Sports Direct store and existing Heatons stores are being altered in order to additionally accommodate a Sports Direct store. Older stores have the Sports Direct branded as "Sportsworld", a former named used in the UK but which continued to be used in Ireland for some time after.

The majority of Heatons stores (from a peak of over 50) have closed in their entirety to be replaced by a Sports Direct store alongside a smaller "Brand Max" store (another Frasers Group brand) selling some of what Heatons formerly sold.

References

External links
 

Department stores of Ireland
Companies based in Dublin (city)
Clothing retailers of Ireland
Irish companies established in 1946
Retail companies established in 1946
Sports Direct